KPXE-TV (channel 50) is a television station in Kansas City, Missouri, United States, affiliated with Ion Television. Owned by Inyo Broadcast Holdings, the station maintains offices on Oak Street and Cleaver Boulevard in Kansas City, Missouri, and its transmitter is located in the city's Brown Estates section. 

KPXE-TV also serves as the de facto Ion outlet for the St. Joseph market, as that area does not have an Ion station of its own.

History

Prior channel 50

Channel 50 in Kansas City first signed on the air on October 29, 1969 as KCIT-TV. Founded by Allied Broadcasting, it was the first independent station to sign on in the Kansas City market and the first new commercial station to sign on in the area since the short-lived DuMont Television Network affiliate KCTY (on channel 25) debuted in 1954. Channel 50 programming primarily consisted of shows that the three network-affiliated television stations in Kansas City preempted, as well as some local programming.

Allied Broadcasting, owned by 20 local stockholders, could not survive a downturn in the economy and competition from a new independent station that signed on a year later, KBMA-TV channel 41 (now NBC affiliate KSHB-TV). KBMA-TV had wealthier owners and a stronger signal than channel 50. KCIT-TV cut programming hours in June, only to go silent July 8, 1971, after several days of bare minimum programming. The station's technical facilities were acquired for use in relaunching KCPT (channel 19) with color capability. KBMA-TV became the sole independent station in Kansas City for several years afterward until KEKR-TV channel 62 (now KSMO-TV) signed on in September 1983 (the KCIT call letters are now assigned to a Fox-affiliated station in Amarillo, Texas).

Relaunch
The channel 50 allocation remained dormant for several years. On July 2, 1976, Kansas City Youth for Christ, Inc., filed for a construction permit for a new channel 50 TV station, which was granted by the FCC on April 29, 1977. The new station signed on December 15, 1978 as KYFC, named after its owner. Operating as a noncommercial independent station, its lineup largely consisted of religious programming through the 1980s, however a few "family-friendly" secular shows had been added to its schedule. The station ran newscasts from CNN Headline News at least once a day for several years, replacing the commercials during breaks within the simulcasts with other announcements.

Pledges to support the station declined during the 1990s. Station managers also grew concerned about the cost of converting to digital operations, something they were reluctant to pass on to their financial supporters. In 1997, the station was sold to Paxson Communications, and began to air infomercials from the Infomall TV Network (inTV) and programming from The Worship Network shortly thereafter, along with some religious programs. On April 28 of that year, the station also changed its call letters to KINB. On January 13, 1998, the station changed its callsign again, this time to KPXE; then eight months later on August 31, the station became a charter owned-and-operated station of Pax TV when that network launched.

In 2001, KPXE entered into a joint sales agreement with NBC affiliate KSHB, as part of an agreement between Paxson Communications and three stations owned by the Cincinnati-based E. W. Scripps Company (which also involved KSHB sister stations WPTV in West Palm Beach, Florida and KJRH in Tulsa, Oklahoma).

Sale to Scripps and resale to Inyo
On September 24, 2020, Scripps (owner of KSHB-TV and KMCI-TV) announced that it would purchase Ion Media for $2.65 billion, with financing from Berkshire Hathaway. With this purchase, Scripps will divest 23 Ion-owned stations, but no announcement has been made as to which stations that Scripps will divest as part of the move (KPXE-TV is likely to be one of the divested outlets since Scripps already owns two stations in the Kansas City market). The proposed divestitures will allow the merged company to fully comply with the FCC local and national ownership regulations. Scripps has agreed to a transaction with an unnamed buyer, who has agreed to maintain Ion affiliations for the stations.

Newscasts
In September 2001, as part of its joint sales agreement with that station, KPXE-TV began airing tape delayed rebroadcasts of KSHB-TV's 6:00 and 10:00 p.m. newscasts each Monday through Friday evening at 6:30 and 10:30 p.m. (the latter beginning shortly before that program's live broadcast ended on KSHB). The news rebroadcasts ended on June 30, 2005, when the network's other news share agreements with major network affiliates throughout the United States were terminated upon the network's rebranding as i: Independent Television, as a result of the network's financial troubles.

Technical information

Subchannels
The station's digital signal is multiplexed:

Prior to January 31, 2010, KPXE offered The Worship Network on digital subchannel 50.4. KPXE began broadcasting its main 50.1 channel in high definition in late spring 2010.

Analog-to-digital conversion
KPXE-TV shut down its analog signal, over UHF channel 50, on June 12, 2009, the official date in which full-power television stations in the United States transitioned from analog to digital broadcasts under federal mandate. The station's digital signal continued to broadcasts on its pre-transition UHF channel 51. Through the use of PSIP, digital television receivers display the station's virtual channel as its former UHF analog channel 50.

In early 2015, KPXE was granted a construction permit by the FCC to move their signal to channel 30, as the FCC is selling off the high UHF spectrum for wireless communications. Viewers will still see channel 50 on their televisions via PSIP. The move to channel 30 took place in the early morning hours of May 30, 2015, with the FCC issuing the license to operate on channel 30 on July 6, 2015.

References

External links

David Johnson's history of the late & lamented KCIT-TV

Ion Television affiliates
Court TV affiliates
Defy TV affiliates
Scripps News affiliates
TrueReal affiliates
Television channels and stations established in 1978
1978 establishments in Missouri
Television stations in the Kansas City metropolitan area